Triphenylmethyl hexafluorophosphate (also triphenylcarbenium hexafluorophosphate, trityl hexafluorophosphate, or tritylium hexafluorophosphate) is an organic salt with the formula , consisting of the triphenylcarbenium cation  and the hexafluorophosphate anion .

Triphenylmethyl hexafluorophosphate is a brown powder that hydrolyzes readily to triphenylmethanol. It is used as a catalyst and reagent in organic syntheses.

Preparation
Triphenylmethyl hexafluorophosphate can be prepared by combining silver hexafluorophosphate with triphenylmethyl chloride:

A second method involves protonolysis of triphenylmethanol:

Structure and reactions
Triphenylmethyl hexafluorophosphate readily hydrolyzes, in a reaction that is the reverse of one of its syntheses:

Triphenylmethyl hexafluorophosphate has been used for abstracting hydride from organic compounds. Treatment of metal-alkene and diene complexes one can generate allyl and pentadienyl complexes, respectively.

Triphenylmethyl perchlorate is a common substitute for triphenylmethyl hexafluorophosphate. However, the perchlorate is not used as widely, because, like other organic perchlorates, it is potentially explosive.

See also
 Triphenylmethyl radical
 Triphenylcarbenium
 Triphenylmethane
 Triphenylmethanol
 Triphenylmethyl chloride

References

Aromatic compounds
Carbocations
Hexafluorophosphates
Phenyl compounds